"Millie" is a 1913 short story by Katherine Mansfield. It was first published in The Blue Review in June 1913, and was republished in Something Childish and Other Stories (1924).

Plot summary
Millie is alone in her house, as her husband and the other men have gone to find Harrison, an English handyman who has supposedly killed Mr Williamson. After looking at her wedding pictures in Mount Cook, she hears a noise coming from the garden and finds a wounded man lying there. She offers him food and realises it is Harrison; she decides to feed him anyway when she sees how beleaguered he comes across. Millie sees that he is just a boy and that awakes a maternal instinct in her. She vows that he will go free.

The men later come home and have settled down from the night when they hear a noise outside. It is Harrison attempting to escape from his hiding place by riding Sid's horse. Immediately, they decide to chase him on foot. Millie's final, shrieked reaction to the pursuit is ambiguous; it is not clear whether she is gleeful at their futile attempt to catch Harrison, or whether she has had a change of heart and, in the heat of the moment, is spurring the hunters on.

References

External links
 Text version of Millie hosted by the New Zealand Electronic Text Collection

Modernist short stories
1913 short stories
Short stories by Katherine Mansfield
Works originally published in Rhythm (literary magazine)